Mauro Scocco (born 11 September 1962) is a Swedish pop artist of Italian descent. He has been described as "one of the sharpest songwriters in Sweden". Scocco was the singer for the pop group Ratata (1980–83) transformed into a duo with Johan Ekelund (1983–89). After Ratata, Scocco has continued as a solo artist since. In 2014, he cooperated with Plura Jonsson releasing a joint album as Mauro & Plura.

Early life and career
Scocco was born in Fristad in Borås. He grew up in Stockholm and in Borås. Scocco formed the pop group Ratata in 1980 along with a few classmates while he was still in school. The first single was "För varje dag" ("For each day") released on the debut album Ratata in 1981. After the break-up of Ratata in 1989 Scocco started a successful solo career and has released many songs that have reached top positions on the Swedish charts; "Sarah", "Vem är han?" ("Who is he?"), "Till de ensamma" ("For the lonely"), "Nelly", "Långsamt farväl" ("Long Goodbye") and "Överallt" ("Everywhere") are among the most recognized. Besides being a solo artist he also writes and produces music for other pop singers, of which Lisa Nilsson is the most famous. Scocco wrote "Himlen runt hörnet" ("Heaven around the corner") for her and it became a hit in Scandinavia in the early 1990s that made her career skyrocket.

In 1991, Scocco released an album with instrumental piano music, Det Sjungande Trädet ("The singing tree"), with inspiration from Erik Satie and expressionistic art. In the spring of 2004, Scocco was a disc jockey in the talkshow Sen kväll med Luuk on TV4, in line with the dry, ironic humour of the show. In the fall of 2005 Scocco released the single "Kall Stjärna" ("Cold star") from the album Herr Jimsons Äventyr ("The adventures of Mr. Jimson"), which made it to the top list over downloaded singles on iTunes.

Ratata

Mauro Scocco was also a lead singer of the four-piece band Swedish band Ratata formed in 1980 made up of Scocco and Heinz Liljedahl, Anders Skog, Johan Kling. Their debut single was "För varje dag" in 1981 followed by "Ögon av is". Both appeared in their self-titled 1982 debut album Ratata. Immediately after release of Jackie, their second album, including the title track as single, Ratata disbanded in 1982 after just three years of activity.

But Scocco continued to use the name as a duo when he was joined by Johan Ekelund. For studio and live gigs, the duo relied on musicians to aid in the shows. The duo continued to have a great number of hit singles and released many more charting albums. The duo had a brief comeback in 2002.

Personal life
Mauro Scocco's brother Sandro Scocco is a well-known Swedish economist.

Discography
For a full discography while in Ratata from 1980 to 1989, refer to band / duo page)

Albums

Others
2007: Saker Som Jag Gjort: texter & noter – prosa & bilder [Book + 3 CDs]

Compilation solo albums

Singles

Mauro & Plura
Albums jointly with Plura Jonsson

References

External links
Unofficial discography 

1962 births
Hollywood Records artists
Living people
Singers from Stockholm
Swedish pop singers
Swedish-language singers
Swedish people of Italian descent
Swedish multi-instrumentalists
Sommar (radio program) hosts